The Íþróttafélag Reykjavíkur men's basketball team, commonly known as ÍR, is the men's basketball department of Íþróttafélag Reykjavíkur. It is based in Reykjavík, Iceland and currently plays in Úrvalsdeild karla. ÍR was one of the pioneers of basketball in Iceland and one of the founding members of the men's Úrvalsdeild. From 1954 to 1977, the team won fifteen national championships. In 1964, it became the first Icelandic team to compete in a continental competition when it defeated the Collegians from Belfast, 71-17,  in the first round of the 1964–65 FIBA European Champions Cup (now called EuroLeague).

History
ÍR's men's basketball department was founded in 1949 and its first chairman was Finnbjörn Þorvaldsson. From 1960 to 1965 the team won 47 games in a row in the national tournament and the Reykjavík Tournament.

Return to the playoffs: The Borce Ilievski era. 

In November 2015, ÍR fired Bjarni Magnússon after a bad start and replaced him with assistant coach Borce Ilievski. With Ilievski, the teams fortune did not change at first and the team finished 4-12 the rest of the way, finishing 10th and missing out of the playoffs. The following season, the team fared better and won 11 out of 22 games, good for a seventh place finish and a trip to the playoffs for the first time in six years. In the playoffs, ÍR lost to second seeded Stjarnan in three games.

Before the 2017–18 season, ÍR signed former Marshall University center, Ryan Taylor. Taylor's performances alongside point guard Matthías Orri Sigurðarson got ÍR into second place in the league after the regular season. In the playoffs ÍR faced seventh seeded Stjarnan in the first round. Following the third game of the series, which ÍR won, Taylor was suspended for three games for having hit Stjarnan's center Hlynur Bæringsson, in the back of the head. Despite this, ÍR won the series 3-1. Taylor missed the first two games of the second round series against eventual finalists Tindastóll. Tindastóll dispatched of ÍR in four games, 3-1.

Despite the heartbreaking loss in the previous year there was optimism in ÍR for the 2018–19 season. Taylor had left and was replaced by Americans Gerald Robinson and Justin Martin. The season did not go as well as the previous year. Martin was released from his contract in January, despite having had a 50 point game a couple weeks earlier. Former Westchester Knick, Kevin Capers, was signed to replace him.

ÍR scraped into the playoffs as a 7th seed and was due to face second seeded Njarðvík in the first round. ÍR lost the first game away from home as Capers was ejected for having slapped an opposing player in the head. Capers was suspended for the second game as ÍR found themselves in a 0-2 hole in a best of five series.

Capers returned in a away victory in game three. The victory sparked hope in the ÍR team which eventually came back and won the series 3-2 to set up a meeting with rivals and league champions Stjarnan. ÍR and Stjarnan had faced off in the Icelandic Cup semi-finals a few months earlier, won by Stjarnan but the game was most remembered for the fight that ensued between the teams supporter groups. Ghetto Hooligans and Silfurskeiðin.

Stjarnan totally obliterated ÍR in the first game in Ásgarður. Brandon Rozzell dominated the game and many counted ÍR out of the series after the first game. Things would not get so simple for Stjarnan as ÍR won two games in a row and was suddenly in position to defeat Stjarnan in game four at home. Stjarnan won in Seljaskóli to set up ÍR's second game five of the post-season.

The winner of the series would go on and face five-time champion powerhouse KR which had had a disappointing regular season and finished as the fifth seed. ÍR won game five and got into the finals for the first time since the playoff format was introduced in 1983.

In game one at KR the atmosphere was electric as Matthías Sigurðarson, formerly of KR, scored two free throws at the end of the fourth quarter to get into over time. In OT ÍR dominated and captain Sigurkarl Jóhannesson dunked as time expired as commentator Henry Gunnarsson yelled,: "The giant (KR) has been knocked out. The giant has been knocked out."

The star studded, title winning KR team took game two in Hertz-hellirinn in four quarters. In game three KR took control and lead for most of the game. ÍR's loud fanbase was silenced as shot after shot went down for KR, but a performance long remembered by the fans by Kevin Capers kept ÍR in the game and eventually secured another overtime in a dramatic fashion. 

The tense situation continued in overtime and as the game was tied in the dying seconds KR thought they had stolen the ball and would have an opportunity to score the game winner. A foul was called which allowed ÍR the chance to win in DHL-höllin for the second time in a row, in overtime in the finals and take a 2-1 series lead against the five-time consecutive champions.

Kevin Capers waited as the shot clock ran down, made his move. Three seconds left and the ball was tossed to veteran forward Trausti Eiríksson who found 21-year old captain Sigurkarl Jóhannesson open in the corner. Jóhannesson's three hit the net as time expired and ÍR had the chance to win the championship at home in game four.

With the Íslandsmeistarabikar in a crowded Hertz-hellir for game four ÍR started strong and lead by 15 in the third quarter but the experienced KR team found a way to get back and took game four and set up ÍR's third game five in three series. The loss was a heartbreak for ÍR but the bigger shock would come the day after. After having been fouled hard by Jón Arnór Stefánsson, former Dallas Maverick, KR-legend and widely regarded as the greatest Icelandic player ever, Kevin Capers had broken his hand and was out for the final game of the season, the title clincher.

Missing their best scorer ÍR faltered and after a first quarter shooting clinic by KR point guard Mike DiNunno and KR eventually won their sixth title in a row.

On 22 October, the Borce Ilievski era came to an end when he resigned from ÍR following a 0–3 start to the 2021–22 season.

Arena
ÍR plays its home games at the TM-Hellirinn.

European record

In September 1975 ÍR was drawn from a pool of teams to face Real Madrid in the 1975–76 FIBA European Champions Cup. While they were eligible as the national champions to do so, the team never intended to participate in the tournament due to high costs involved and thus didn't register for it nor pay the participation fees. A letter by the Icelandic Basketball Association which informed FIBA on which Icelandic teams where eligible to participate in official FIBA tournaments was mistakenly taken as a confirmation of their participation. Due to the mistake, Real Madrid went through with a walkover.

Trophies and awards

Trophies
 Úrvalsdeild karla: (15)
1954, 1955, 1957, 1960, 1961, 1962, 1963, 1964, 1969, 1970, 1971, 1972, 1973, 1975, 1977

 Icelandic Basketball Cup: (2)
2001, 2007

 Division I: (2)
1987, 2000

Awards
Úrvalsdeild Men's Domestic Player of the Year
 Birgir Jakobsson – 1972
 Herbert Arnarson – 1995
 Kristinn Jörundsson – 1975, 1977
 Pétur Guðmundsson – 1983
 Þorsteinn Hallgrímsson – 1969, 1971

Úrvalsdeild Men's Domestic All-First Team
 Eiríkur Önundarson – 2001, 2003
 Herbert Arnarson – 1995, 1996
 Hreggviður Magnússon – 2008
 Matthías Orri Sigurðarson – 2017, 2019
 Sigurður Þorsteinsson – 2019
 Sveinbjörn Claessen – 2008

Úrvalsdeild Men's Young Player of the Year
 Herbert Arnarson – 1995

Úrvalsdeild Men's Coach of the Year
 Borce Ilievski – 2019

Notable players

Coaches
 Evald Mikson (1950–1952)
 Helgi Jóhannsson (1952–?)
 Einar Ólafsson (?–1976)
 Þorsteinn Hallgrímsson (1976–1977)
 Paul Stewart (1978–1979)
 Einar Ólafsson (1979–1980)
 Einar Bollason (1986–1988)
 Sturla Örlygsson  (1988–1989)
 Thomas Lee (1989–1990)
 Jón Jörundsson  (1990–1991)
 John Rhodes (1994–1996)
 Antonio Vallejo (1996–1998)
 Karl Jónsson (1998)
 Jón Örn Guðmundsson (2000–2002)
 Eggert Garðarsson (2002–2003)
 Eggert Maríuson (2003–2005)
 Jón Örn Guðmundsson and   Halldór Kristmannsson (2005–2006)
 Bárður Eyþórsson (2006)
 Jón Örn Guðmundsson and  Halldór Kristmannsson (2006)
 Jón Arnar Ingvarsson (2006–2009)
 Gunnar Sverrison (2010–2012)
 Jón Arnar Ingvarsson (2012–2013)
 Örvar Kristjánsson (2013–2014)
 Bjarni Magnússon (2014–2015)
 Borce Ilievski (2015–2021)
 Ísak Máni Wíum and   Sveinbjörn Claessen (2021)
 Friðrik Ingi Rúnarsson (2021–2022)
 Ísak Máni Wíum (2022–present)

Reserve team
In 2019, ÍR-b lost to Breiðablik in the 3. deild karla finals. It nonetheless achieved promotion to the 2. deild karla.

Titles
Division III
 Runner-up: 2019

References

External links
Official website
Eurobasket team profile
Félög - ÍR - kki.is  

ÍR (basketball)
Sport in Reykjavík